The Mount Royal Range is a mountain range in the Hunter region of New South Wales, Australia.

Location and features
The Mount Royal Range is a spur on the eastern side of the Great Dividing Range. It diverges from the Liverpool Range at a point north of Scone, New South Wales, near Ben Halls Gap. The range generally forms the divide between the Hunter River and Manning River drainage basins, both of which drain to the Tasman Sea.

The range contains a number of prominent peaks including: 
 Brumlow Tops with an elevation of  
 Mount Polblue with an elevation of   
 Mount Barrington with an elevation of  
 Mount Royal with an elevation of  
 Mount Allyn with an elevation of  
 Prospero with an elevation of  
 Gulph Mountain 
 Gog and Magog 
 The Pinnacle
 Paddys Ridge 
 Mount William
 Mount Paterson 
 Mount Toonumbue
 the Belgrave Pinnacle
 Mirannie Mountain
 Mount George
 Hudsons Peak
 Mount Johnstone

Etymology
The range is named after Mount Royal, one of its prominent peaks.

Water storage
To provide water for the Bayswater Power Station, the Barnard River Scheme was constructed in the 1980s so water could be transported over the range into the Hunter River.

Geology
The Mount Royal range forms the northern rim of the Hunter Region.  The Barrington Tops, an elevated plateau at the headwaters of the Barrington River, are part of the Mount Royal Range.  The World Heritage listed Barrington Tops National Park includes this area.

Gallery

See also

 List of mountains of Australia

References

Dungog Shire
Gondwana Rainforests of Australia
Great Dividing Range
Hunter River (New South Wales)